Spring Hill is an unincorporated community in Cullman County, Alabama, United States, located on U.S. Route 278,  west-northwest of Cullman.

References

Unincorporated communities in Cullman County, Alabama
Unincorporated communities in Alabama